Robbins Crossroads, also known as Robbins, is an unincorporated community in Jefferson County, Alabama, United States.

History
The community is named for the Robbins family, who moved to the area from Pendleton District, South Carolina. At one time, Robbins Crossroads was home to a grist mill, cotton gin, saw mill, general store, and saloon.

A post office operated under the name Robbins Crossroads from 1873 to 1896.

References

Unincorporated communities in Jefferson County, Alabama
Unincorporated communities in Alabama